Barnardia japonica, the Japanese jacinth, is a bulbous flowering plant in the family Asparagaceae, subfamily Scilloideae (also treated as the family Hyacinthaceae). It is one of the two species of the genus Barnardia, found in east China, Korea, Japan, Taiwan and East Russia.

Description 
The plant bears a terminal raceme of pink small flowers. It is said to resemble a fox's tail. The shape of the plant is elegant. Its habitats include open slopes and forest margins.

Systematics and taxonomy 
The genus Barnardia was created by John Lindley in 1826 together with the single species B. scilloides. However, this species had already been described as Ornithogalum japonicum by Carl Peter Thunberg in 1784, so that it is now called B. japonica.

The plant forms a genetic complex with two genome types, noted A and B, and diploid, allo-triploid and aneuploid specimens in natural populations.

Natural occurrences 
In China (Chinese name:棉棗兒 or 绵枣儿), it can be found in Guangdong, Guangxi, Hebei, Heilongjiang, Henan, Hubei, Hunan, Jiangsu, Jiangxi, Jilin, Liaoning, Nei Mongol, Shanxi, Sichuan and Yunnan.

In Northern Taiwan, the plant occupies habitats under 700 meters high in a small amount. From July to August, it can be easily spotted on the open hillsides or fields along the roads in Dongyin and Siyin Island. It also can be found in Nangan, but the majority is in Dongyin and Siyin. It has been listed as a candidate for 'Township Flower' in Dongyin.

In Russia, it is found around Vladivostok, though it is probably extinct there (according to the Red Data Book of Russia).

Cultivation 
Barnardia japonica is cultivated as an ornamental bulb. In a temperate climate it requires a sunny position where it flowers in the autumn. As well as the normal pink-flowered form, a white form (Scilla scilloides var. albo-viridis) is in cultivation.

Uses 
The leaves and roots are edible. The bulbs can be used in medicine.

Chemistry 
The homoisoflavones scillavones A and B can be isolated from the bulbs of B japonica.

The bulb also contains eucosterol glycosides showing anti-tumor activities.

References

External links 
 
 
 

Flora of China
Flora of Japan
Flora of Korea
Flora of Taiwan
Flora of Russia
Plants described in 1829
Scilloideae